Sadiya Assembly constituency is one of the 126 assembly constituencies of  Assam a North-eastern state of India. Sadiya is also part of Lakhimpur Lok Sabha constituency.

Members of Legislative Assembly
 1978: Bipin Hazarika, Communist Party of India (Marxist)
 1983: Lambheswar Sonowal, Indian National Congress
 1985: Jyotsna Sonowal, Independent
 1990: Debendra Nath Baruah, Indian National Congress
 1996: Jagadish Bhuyan, Asom Gana Parishad
 2001: Jagadish Bhuyan, Asom Gana Parishad
 2006: Bolin Chetia, Indian National Congress 
 2011: Bolin Chetia, Indian National Congress 
 2016: Bolin Chetia, Bharatiya Janata Party
 2021: Bolin Chetia , Bharatiya Janata Party

Election results

See also
 Sadiya
 Tinsukia district
 List of constituencies of Assam Legislative Assembly

References

External links 
 

Assembly constituencies of Assam
Tinsukia district